Evans Lake is a lake in the U.S. state of Washington.

Evans Lake was named after Berry Evans, a pioneer who settled the area.

See also
List of lakes in Washington

References

Lakes of Okanogan County, Washington
Lakes of Washington (state)